Terri Schneider (born June 29, 1961) is an endurance athlete, motivational speaker, author, coach, and consultant. In 1990, she won the Escape from Alcatraz and took third place at the 1990 Ironman World Championship.

Education
Terri earned a MS in Sport Psychology with a research emphasis on team dynamics and a thesis on risk taking from San Jose State University after earning a Bachelor of Science degree in Exercise Physiology at Cal Poly San Luis Obispo.

Personal Accomplishments
 Completed 22 Ironman triathlons, three of them among the top six women at the Kona Ironman World Championships; continues to compete in triathlon, winning her age group in every race she's completed
Several seven-day running stage races in Costa Rica, Egypt (Sahara Desert), and China (Gobi Desert)
Completed five 100-mile trail races and many 50 mile and 50K trail races
Completed seven Eco-Challenge competitions, Mild Seven Outdoor Quest in China, Raid Gauloises in Tibet/Nepal, and many other one-day adventure races
Mountain summits on six continents
Additional adventures: Eight-day mountain bike adventure through remote central Mexico; trekking with the Achuar in the Amazon Jungle in Ecuador; ’99 La Ruta de Los Conquistadores (aka “The Toughest Mountain Bike Race on the Planet”) three-day mountain bike race in Costa Rica; Camel Trophy, Georgia – US Trials finalist, only female finalist

Personal life
Terri lives in Santa Cruz, CA.

Publications

References

External links
 Terri Schneider's Personal Webpage
 Risk Is Relative: Elite Athletes Take Biggest Risks

American female triathletes
Living people
1961 births
California Polytechnic State University alumni
Sportspeople from Santa Cruz, California
21st-century American women